Florence is an unincorporated census-designated place in York Township, Switzerland County, in the U.S. state of Indiana. The Belterra Casino Resort & Spa is located just outside town.

History
The community was laid out in 1817 under the name New York. A post office was established under this name in 1827, and was renamed to Florence in 1847. The post office is still currently operating.

Geography

Climate
The climate in this area is characterized by hot, humid summers and generally mild to cool winters.  According to the Köppen Climate Classification system, Florence has a humid subtropical climate, abbreviated "Cfa" on climate maps.

Demographics

References

See also
List of cities and towns along the Ohio River

Census-designated places in Switzerland County, Indiana
Census-designated places in Indiana
Indiana populated places on the Ohio River